Baeckea gunniana, commonly known as alpine baeckea, is a species of flowering plant in the family Myrtaceae and is endemic to alpine and sub-alpine areas of south-eastern Australia. It is a densely-branched shrub with egg-shaped to oblong leaves and small white flowers with four to six stamens.

Description 
It is sometimes prostrate, spreading over rocks and boulders. The branchlets have papery or fibrous brown bark. There are four to six stamens all about the same length. The ovary has a single locule, the style is needle-shaped and in a small dent in the top of the ovary. (The unilocular ovary is unique in the genus.) The fruit is a cup-like capsule, the seeds small and angular, remaining inconspicuous on the ground upon release.

Taxonomy and phylogeny 
Baeckea gunniana was first formally described in 1843 by the German botanist Johannes Conrad Schauer in Walpers' book Repertorium Botanices Systematicae. The specific epithet (gunniana) honours Ronald Campbell Gunn.

Distribution and habitat 
Alpine baeckea is restricted to alpine or subalpine regions, from Mount Ginini in the Australian Capital Territory and Mount Kosciuszko in south-eastern New South Wales to eastern Victoria and south-western Tasmania.

Baeckea gunniana is commonly found growing with species such as Callistemon pityoides, Epacris paludosa, and Empodisma minus, in heathlands or boggy sedgeland. It is also common near creeks, and sometimes in shaded areas under Eucalyptus species.

Ecology
This species forms an integral part of the broad-toothed mouse habitat in New South Wales, providing protection from predators and large grazers.

Uses

Use in horticulture 
The seed coat/covering or testa of some Baeckea species has been recorded to form a physical barrier inhibiting seed germination. This may be reverted by removing or nicking the testa using a needle or scalpel, improving the rate of germination. B. gunniana can also be vegetatively propagated from cuttings of semi-hardened new growth.

Other uses
Baeckea leaves are edible and often used as a tea substitute because of their aromatic citrus-like flavour. Extracts from B. gunniana have been found to inhibit the activity of DNA Polymerase enzyme.

References

gunniana
Endemic flora of Australia
Flora of New South Wales
Flora of the Australian Capital Territory
Flora of Victoria (Australia)
Flora of Tasmania
Taxa named by Johannes Conrad Schauer
Plants described in 1843